Pride and Prejudice is a 2014 South Korean television series starring Choi Jin-hyuk, Baek Jin-hee, Choi Min-soo, Lee Tae-hwan and Son Chang-min. It aired on MBC from October 27, 2014 to January 13, 2015 on Mondays and Tuesdays at 22:00 for 21 episodes.

Plot
Gu Dong-chi passed the bar exam right after high school (bypassing college altogether) and became a prosecutor at age 21. With his brilliant legal mind and over ten years of experience since, Dong-chi has sharpened his skills of figuring out what other people are really thinking, even as he keeps his own private thoughts inscrutable and enjoys the perks of the bureaucratic system.

Han Yeol-mu is a prosecutor-in-training who gets assigned under Dong-chi. Yeol-mu was once a detective, and she decided to become a public prosecutor because of her dogged pursuit of truth and justice.

Dong-chi finds himself working with Yeol-mu, and along with cool-headed veteran prosecutor Moon Hee-man, investigator and former taekwondo athlete Kang Soo, and loose-tongued unemployed gambler Jung Chang-gi, they form a team of "loser prosecutors" who fight for innocent, poor, and powerless citizens and battle against crime, prideful authorities and a prejudiced system.

Cast

Main characters
Choi Jin-hyuk as Goo Dong-chi
Noh Tae-yeop as young Goo Dong-chi
Baek Jin-hee as Han Yeol-moo
Park Si-eun as young Han Yeol-moo
Choi Min-soo as Moon Hee-man
Lee Tae-hwan as Kang Soo / Seo Tae-won
Son Chang-min as Jung Chang-gi

Supporting characters
Choi Woo-shik as Lee Jang-won
Jang Hang-sun as Yoo Dae-gi
Jung Hye-sung as Yoo Kwang-mi
Roh Joo-hyun as Lee Jong-gon
Kim Yeo-jin as Oh Do-jung
Baek Soo-ryun as Baek Geum-ok
Kim Na-woon as Kim Myung-sook
Kim Kang-hoon as Kim Chan
Jung Chan as Choi Gwang-gook
Han Gap-soo as Goo Young-bae
Song Sam-dong as Kwon Dae-yong
Lee Hyun-gul as Baek Sang-dae
Jung Ji-hoon as Han Byul
Kim Hae-na as Cha Yoon-hee
Kim Hye-yoon as Kang Han-na (Ep. 15)

Cameos
Jung Sung-mo as Han Byul's mother 
Kwak Ji-min as Song Ah-reum
Jung Chan as Choi Kwang-gook
Im Seung-dae as Kang Moo-sung
Choi Joon-yong as Oh Tae-gyun
Maeng Sang-hoon as Park Soon-bae

Ratings
As reported by Nielsen Korea, the evening drama premiered on October 27, 2014 with an 11.2% rating, recording the highest rating in its time slot, significantly ahead of its competition, Naeil's Cantabile (KBS2) and Secret Door (SBS).

Awards and nominations

References

External links
Pride and Prejudice official MBC website 
Pride and Prejudice at MBC Global Media

2014 South Korean television series debuts
2015 South Korean television series endings
MBC TV television dramas
Television series about prosecutors
South Korean legal television series
South Korean romance television series
Television series by Bon Factory Worldwide